Lake View is a census-designated place and unincorporated community located in DeSoto County, Mississippi, United States, near the Mississippi/Tennessee border just south of Memphis and north of the village of Walls. Lake View is located on the former Yazoo and Mississippi Valley Railroad.

During Prohibition, multiple Memphis businessmen opened nightclubs in Lake View.

A post office operated under the name Lake View from 1885 to 1895 and under the name Lakeview from 1895 to 1932.

From 1910 to 1928, the Memphis Street Railway Co operated the Memphis and Lakeview Railway. This was a 10 mile track that had four streetcars assigned to it.

The Valley Brick and Tile Company once operated a brick factory in Lake View.

It was first named as a CDP in the 2020 Census which listed a population of 299.

Demographics

2020 census

Note: the US Census treats Hispanic/Latino as an ethnic category. This table excludes Latinos from the racial categories and assigns them to a separate category. Hispanics/Latinos can be of any race.

References

Unincorporated communities in DeSoto County, Mississippi
Unincorporated communities in Mississippi
Memphis metropolitan area
Census-designated places in DeSoto County, Mississippi